Shap is a civil parish in the Eden District, Cumbria, England.  It contains 31 listed buildings that are recorded in the National Heritage List for England.  Of these, one is listed at Grade II*, the middle of the three grades, and the others are at Grade II, the lowest grade.  The parish contains the village of Shap, the hamlet of Keld, and the surrounding countryside.  Most of the listed buildings are houses and associated structures, farmhouses and farm buildings.  The other listed buildings include a church and items in the churchyard, a chapel, a hotel, a former market hall, a war memorial, and four mileposts.

Key

Buildings

Notes and references

Notes

Citations

Sources

Lists of listed buildings in Cumbria
Listed buildings